The holder of the post Vice-Admiral of Cheshire  was responsible for the defence County of Cheshire, England. As a Vice-Admiral, the post holder was the chief of naval administration for his district. His responsibilities included pressing men for naval service, deciding the lawfulness of prizes (captured by privateers), dealing with salvage claims for wrecks and acting as a judge.

History
The earliest record of an appointment was of Edward Stanley, 3rd Earl of Derby bef. 1569–1572

In 1863 the Registrar of the Admiralty Court stated that the offices had 'for many years been purely honorary' (HCA 50/24 pp. 235–6). Appointments were made by the Lord High Admiral when this officer existed. When the admiralty was in commission appointments were made by the crown by letters patent under the seal of the admiralty court.

Vice Admirals of Cheshire
This is a list of people who have served as Vice-Admiral of Cheshire.

Cheshire and Lancashire
Edward Stanley, 3rd Earl of Derby bef. 1569–1572
Henry Stanley, 4th Earl of Derby 1573–1593
Ferdinando Stanley, 5th Earl of Derby 1593–1594
vacant
William Stanley, 6th Earl of Derby bef. 1606–1638
James Stanley, 7th Earl of Derby 1638–?

Cheshire
Sir William Brereton, 1st Baronet 1644–1649
Interregnum
Charles Stanley, 8th Earl of Derby 1661–1672  (also Vice-Admiral of Lancashire)
William Banks 1673–1676 (also Vice-Admiral of Lancashire)
vacant
William Stanley, 9th Earl of Derby 1684–1691  (also Vice-Admiral of Lancashire)
Charles Gerard, 2nd Earl of Macclesfield 1691–1701  (also Vice-Admiral of Lancashire)
Richard Savage, 4th Earl Rivers 1702–1703  (also Vice-Admiral of Lancashire)
Hugh Cholmondeley, 1st Earl of Cholmondeley 1703–1725
George Cholmondeley, 2nd Earl of Cholmondeley 1725–1733
George Cholmondeley, 3rd Earl of Cholmondeley 1733–1770
George Cholmondeley, 1st Marquess of Cholmondeley 1770–1827
George Grey, 6th Earl of Stamford 1827–1845
vacant
Bertram Talbot, 17th Earl of Shrewsbury 1854–1856

References

External links
Institute of Historical Research

Military ranks of the United Kingdom
Vice-Admirals
Military history of Cheshire
C